Shawsheen (Shoshine) (1845-?) otherwise known as She-towitch, or Susan, was a Native American woman who was a part of the Tabeguache (Uncompahgre) Ute tribe and sister to Chief Ouray.  She is known for her capture by the Cheyenne and Arapaho in 1860 or 1861, her protection and care for Arvilla and Josephine Meeker during their captivity, as well as her role within the politics of her tribe as a female leader alongside her sister-in-law, Chipeta.

Childhood and marriage 
Shawsheen was born either on the Western Slope of Colorado, or in northern New Mexico and historians believe that she spent most of her childhood in the Uncompahgre Valley. Like many Young Ute girls, she would have learned the arts of bead work and weaving in order to trade with other Native Americans and settlers.

Shawsheen was married to Chief Johnson 2, otherwise known as Canalla, a White River Ute. The marriage was arranged by her father, Guero in order to increase relations between the Northern Utes and the Tabeguache Utes. After the marriage, Shawsheen left the Uncompahgre Valley to live on the White River with her new family.

Capture by the Cheyenne and Arapaho 
Sometime in 1860 or 1861, while out hunting near the Cache la Podure River on the Eastern Plains of Colorado, Shawsheen and members of her family encountered members of the Cheyenne and Arapaho tribe. During an altercation Shawsheen was taken captive. Her family alerted the United States Cavalry, but troops weren't able to locate her until two years later when soldiers from Camp Collins (now Fort Collins) found her. Historian Brandi Dennison describes the scene: "The cavalry successfully located the raiding party along the Cache la Podure River just as the Cheyenne bound Susan to an unlit pyre." The troops rescued Shawsheen and she was sent to live with Simeon Whitley, a former agent of the Grand River Ute Agency, whom she stayed for a few months before returning home.

During her stay with Whitley, she was able to learn to speak and understand English. Mrs. Collier, wife of Sergeant Collier, the man who led the soldiers that found Shawsheen, gave the name "Susan" to Shawsheen, a name many historians refer to her by today. There is some debate regarding Shawsheen's escape from captivity; many historians cite the story of her rescue from near sacrifice as correct, however the oral traditions of her descendants credit her with escaping on her own. During her time in captivity, she was treated as a slave instead of an adopted family member as in other North American Indian captivities. Her status within the tribe as a slave meant that she was forced into hard labor and menial tasks until her eventual escape.

Meeker Massacre 
The Meeker Massacre was an attack on an Indian Agency by the Ute on September 29, 1879 in Meeker, Colorado. During the massacre, Nathan Meeker, an Indian Agent, along with his ten employees were killed, and his daughter Josephine and wife Arvilla Meeker were taken captive along with other women and children by the Ute. After the Massacre, the Ute met and discussed what to do with the captives. While many urged that the captives be killed or burned at the stake, Shawsheen, along with her husband, adamantly advocated for the release of the captives and their safety. Josephine Meeker said of her captivity, "We all owe our lives to the sister of Chief Ouray..." The captives praised Shawsheen for her kindness in not only advocating for their release, but doing her best in keeping them safe from harm for the duration of their captivity. The captive women even referred to her as "God Bless Susan" for her kindness. After the captives were released they immediately began to write about their experiences and many called for the recognition of Shawsheen for her actions. Jane Swisshelm asked that Shawsheen be given land in Colorado, despite the fact that the Ute's of western Colorado were being removed to Utah.

Shawsheen has been hailed as a hero, by not only the Meeker women, but many others, for her actions within the Meeker Massacre and her protection of the captives. Josephine Meeker wrote about Shawsheen in her captivity narrative. She stated, "I may say more, which is that we all owe our lives to the sister of Chief Ouray." Josephine describes how Shawsheen advocated for their release and ensured their safety.

Names 
Shawsheen has been referred to by many names throughout her historical narrative. Her descendants refer to her as She-Towitch, while many modern historians refer to her as Susan, "Ute Susan" or Shawsheen. She has also been known as Tsashin, Shosheen, Shashein, and Shasheen in other newspaper or familial accounts.

Life and legacy 
Shawsheen's life and contributions to early Colorado history have been recognized by the Greeley Museums in Greeley, Colorado.  This organization also preserves and interprets the Meeker Home Museum, the original home of the Meeker family. In Greeley, there is an elementary school named after her, (Shawsheen Elementary) as well as scholarship on her life and legacy on display at the Greeley Museum.

References 

1845 births
19th-century Native Americans
Ute people
Year of death unknown